Governmental relations between the People's Republic of China and the Republic of Namibia were first established the day after Namibia's independence, but relations with Namibian independence movements date back to the 1960s.

Chinese support for independence movements
Beginning in the 1960s, during the Namibian War of Independence, China provided various indigenous Namibian independence movements (at first South West African National Union (SWANU)) and later South West Africa People's Organization (SWAPO) with "moral and material support".

China since Namibian independence
PR China and Namibia established relations on 22 March 1990, which was the day after Namibia's independence. The government of Namibia is an adherent to the One-China policy.

Economic relations
China and Namibia have developed close economic relations, with trade increasing two-fold between the two countries from 2003 to 2006.

Chinese development finance to Namibia
From 2000 to 2011, there are approximately 64 Chinese official development finance projects identified in Namibia through various media reports. During a February 2007 visit, Chinese President Hu Jintao pledged Namibia "RMB 1 billion of concessional loans, 100 million US dollars of preferential export buyer's credit, RMB 30 million yuan of grants and RMB 30 million of interest-free loans..." In November 2005, Namibian President Hifikepunye Pohama and Chinese Politburo member Li Chang Chun witnessed the signing of a 250 million Yuan concessional loan by Export-Import Bank of China to be used for purchasing locomotives and trains for a new railway being built in northern Namibia.

Migration
A large number of Chinese are estimated to have taken up residence in Namibia since independence. In 2006, their number was estimated at 40,000.

An Yue Jiang scandal
In April 2008, a weapons shipment on the An Yue Jiang sailed from China destined for Zimbabwe. It was stopped from porting in South Africa because of protests regarding the weapons and the disputed Zimbabwean presidential election which had taken place a month earlier. Seeking a destination for the ship, it was rumored that it would be port on Namibia's coast at Walvis Bay. On 24 April 2008, a protest took place in Namibia's capital of Windhoek, where two hundred protesters marched from a Zoo Park in central Windhoek to the Chinese embassy. Among those leading the protesters were Bishop and SWAPO politician Zephania Kameeta and the Legal Assistance Centre. The ship did not port in Namibia.

See also
 Sino-African relations
 Chinese people in Namibia

Bibliography

References

External links
 China buys into Berg Aukas New Era 14 January 2011
 WikiLeaks: Namibia Allows Chinese Immigration to Repay Loans Voice of America, 15 December 2010
 China eyes Namibia's minerals Mail & Guardian, 9 April 2010
 Graft Inquiry in Namibia Finds Clues in China The New York Times, 21 July 2009
 No more Namibia: China blocks search results for entire country OpenNet.net, 22 July 2009

 
China, PR
Namibia
Namibia